Steven S. DeKnight (born October 28, 1965) is an American filmmaker. He is best known for being the creator, head writer, and executive producer of the Starz series Spartacus, including Spartacus: Blood and Sand, Spartacus: Gods of the Arena, Spartacus: Vengeance, and Spartacus: War of the Damned, as well as developing Jupiter's Legacy for Netflix.

Career

DeKnight previously worked on  Smallville, Buffy the Vampire Slayer, and Angel. He also wrote "Swell", a story in the Buffy the Vampire Slayer Season Eight comic series, and served as a consulting producer on Joss Whedon's television series Dollhouse.

In May 2014, DeKnight was reported to be taking over showrunning duties for the first season on the Netflix exclusive television series Daredevil from Drew Goddard, after Goddard's departure due to scheduling conflicts with directing Sinister Six. He was later replaced by Doug Petrie and Marco Ramirez to serve as co-showrunners for the second season of the series.

In 2015, DeKnight joined the Transformers Cinematic Universe franchise's writers room, where Paramount Pictures hired multiple noted screenwriters to flesh out the future of the film series. He directed the science fiction sequel Pacific Rim: Uprising. The original film's director, Guillermo del Toro, remained on the film in the role of producer.

On July 17, 2018, it was announced that DeKnight would be credited as a show-runner and executive producer alongside Lorenzo di Bonaventura and Dan McDermott in the Netflix superhero series, Jupiter's Legacy. On September 16, 2019, it was confirmed that DeKnight departed the series as a showrunner over creative differences in the midst of the production for the first season.

On April 15, 2019, DeKnight joined a host of other writers in firing their agents as part of the WGA's stand against the ATA and the practice of packaging.

Filmography
Film

Television

References

External links
 

American television directors
American male television writers
Film directors from New Jersey
Living people
People from Millville, New Jersey
1965 births
Screenwriters from New Jersey
Television producers from New Jersey